Poth High School is a public high school located in Poth, Texas (USA) and classified as a 3A school by the UIL. It is part of the Poth Independent School District located in south central Wilson County. In 2015, the school was rated "Met Standard" by the Texas Education Agency.

Controversy
In February, 2020 the District refused to allow a student, Newt Johnson, to remain in classes if he continued to grow his hair out to possibly make a wig for his sick sister.  Superintendent Paula Renken alleged the matter was not over an ill person but rather enforcing the school board's rules.  With the support of his parents Mr. Johnson left this place.

Athletics
The Poth Pirates compete in these sports - 

Baseball
Basketball
Cross Country
Football
Golf
Powerlifting
Softball
Tennis
Track and Field
Volleyball

State Titles
Girls Basketball - 
1997(2A), 2007(2A)
Volleyball - 
1995(1A), 1996(2A), 1997(2A), 2004(2A), 2005(2A), 2006(2A), 2009(2A), 2011(2A), 2014(3A)

References

External links
Poth ISD

Schools in Wilson County, Texas
Public high schools in Texas